19 Cathedral Street is an historic building in Dunkeld, Perth and Kinross, Scotland. It is two storeys, with a five-window frontage. It is believed to be a surviving property from a pre-Reformation manse. It was consecrated by the Bishop of Dunkeld in 1516. It was the home of poet and scholar Gavin Douglas (1474–1522).

See also 
 List of listed buildings in Dunkeld And Dowally, Perth and Kinross

References 

Cathedral Street 19
Category B listed buildings in Perth and Kinross
1715 establishments in Scotland